Miravet is a municipality in the comarca of Ribera d'Ebre in the Province of Tarragona, Catalonia, Spain.

The village and the castle was founded by the Moors and  rebuilt by the Knights Templar and transformed into a fortress-monastery, after the conquest of 1153. It is considered to be the largest fortified complex in Catalonia, and one of the best examples of Romanesque, religious and military, architecture of the Templar order in the whole Western world.

References

External links
 Government data pages 

Municipalities in Ribera d'Ebre